Justice Dharam Chand Chaudhary (born 12 March 1958) is an Indian judge. He is former Judge of Himachal Pradesh High Court and also former Acting Chief Justice of Himachal Pradesh High Court.

References 

Living people
Indian judges
1958 births